AFLAC Tower is a tall guyed mast located in Rowley, Iowa in the United States.

Television station KWWL and radio stations KFMW and KNWS-FM broadcast from this tower.  The transmitter site is owned by KWWL's current owner, Quincy Newspapers.

The KWWL transmitter site building features running water and a shower, allowing someone to maintain at least rudimentary living conditions. The site has a backup generator for KWWL's digital channel along with KNWS, but not for their analog signal or KFMW.

See also
 Tallest structures in the U.S.
 List of the world's tallest structures

References

External links
 
 http://www.skyscraperpage.com/diagrams/?b7115
 http://msrmaps.com/GetImageArea.ashx?t=1&s=10&lat=42.400556&lon=-91.843611&w=600&h=400&logo=1&lp=---+None+---

Towers completed in 1984
Radio masts and towers in the United States
Buildings and structures in Buchanan County, Iowa
Towers in Iowa
1984 establishments in Iowa